Tezerjan (also Romanized as Ţezerjān and Tezerjān; also known as Tazarjūn, Ţerezjān, Ţerzejān, and Tizīnjūn) is a village in Shirkuh Rural District of the Central District of Taft County, Yazd province, Iran. At the 2006 National Census, its population was 506 in 166 households. The following census in 2011 counted 393 people in 178 households. The latest census in 2016 showed a population of 355 people in 129 households; it was the largest village in its rural district.

References 

Taft County

Populated places in Yazd Province

Populated places in Taft County